The 1952 Campeonato Profesional was the fifth season of Colombia's top-flight football league. 15 teams compete against one another and played each weekend. The tournament was notable for being the fourth year of El Dorado. Millonarios won the league for 3rd time in its history after getting 46 points.

Background 
The tournament was the fourth year of El Dorado. The number of teams was reduced from 18 to 15: Deportes Caldas and Once Deportivo joined to form Deportivo Manizales. Huracán de Medellín disappeared due to poor performance, while Independiente Medellín had to retire because of an economic crisis.

Universidad, who was also in an economic crisis, received a lot of players from other teams in order to enable their participation in the championship: Santa Fe loaned it Roberto Martínez, Atilio Miotti, Juan Candall, José María Arnaldo, Oscar Contreras, Luis López, Mario Fernández y Angel Perucca; Millonarios loaned Tomás Aves; Junior loaned Heraldo Ferreyro; Deportivo Manizales loaned Segundo Tessori, Vicente Gallina and Osvaldo Bianco; and Deportivo Samarios loaned Milos Dragoilovich.

Millonarios became the first team to win the championship three times, and the first team to win two consecutive titles. Alfredo Di Stéfano became goalscorer of the tournament for the second time in succession. This was the most successful year of the denominated Ballet Azul, in which also played 33 international matches, finishing with 20 wins, 10 draws and 3 losses, being the 4-2 win against Real Madrid its most memorable match.

League system
Every team played two games against each other team, one at home and one away. Teams received two points for a win and one point for a draw. If two or more teams were tied on points, places were determined by goal difference. The team with the most points is the champion of the league.

Teams

a Municipal played its home games at Itagüí

Final standings

Results

Top goalscorers

Source: RSSSF.com Colombia 1952

References

External links 

Dimayor Official Page

Prim
Colombia
Categoría Primera A seasons